Fleisch, a German word meaning flesh or meat, may refer to:

 Fleisch (film) a 1979 German television horror film
 Fleisch Bridge, a bridge in Nuremberg, Germany

People
 Elgar Fleisch (born 1968), Austrian/Swiss academic and singer, songwriter, and musician
 Henri Fleisch (1904–1985), French archaeologist, missionary, and Orientalist
 Jody Fleisch (born 1980), English professional wrestler

See also
 
 Fleischer, a surname
 Flesch (disambiguation)
 Flesh (disambiguation)

German-language surnames
Jewish surnames